Queen Margaret Academy is a Roman Catholic secondary school in the south of Ayr in southwest Scotland. Queen Margaret is state-run by South Ayrshire Council and takes children aged 11 to 18 from the whole of South Ayrshire and parts of East Ayrshire.

History
The origins of the school can be traced back to 1831, when the first attempts were made to establish a school to educate Catholic children in Ayr. The original St Margaret's school was founded in 1856 on the site of what is now St Margaret's Church Hall in Elba Street, Ayr. Administered by the church authorities, money was tight, resources scant and discipline harsh. Years of determined hard work saw standards and pupil numbers rise.

In 1893 the school moved to Whitletts Road, adjacent to Craigie Park, where over seventy-three years it developed from a purely primary to a combined primary and secondary school. An additional building and huts were erected in the early 20th century to cope with the rising school roll. After the Second World War such was the overcrowding that St Catherine's Primary School was built at Dalmilling to relieve the pressure. However, by February 1962 the lack of accommodation was still a serious problem. A fire destroyed one of the main buildings in the October of that year.

In August 1966, the secondary department moved to a new building in Mainholm Road, adjacent to Mainholm Academy, and was renamed Queen Margaret Academy; the primary department remained at Whitletts Road and was renamed St John's Primary School. When the lower school leaving age rose to 16, both Queen Margaret and Mainholm Academies outgrew their accommodation. Consequently, it was decided that Mainholm Academy should also occupy the entire site on Mainholm Road, and a new building be constructed to house the pupils of Queen Margaret Academy. Initially the site of the current Kyle Academy was considered, but felt to be too small.

The school moved into the current buildings in Dalmellington Road in January 1976, and they were officially opened in 1977. Based on an experimental design, the teaching areas are located in one building with large open plan areas across for study and learning. The PE facilities, crush hall and dinner  are in a separate building linked by a covered walkway. Attached to the school is the South Ayrshire Supported Learning Centre, which caters for pupils with specific educational needs.

In January 2016 First Minister Nicola Sturgeon visited the school to announce that a new building would be constructed to replace the current building. Construction began to the left of the site in December 2017 with the demolition of the Dance Area. The new building opened to pupils on 24 October 2019.

Head Teacher 
Following the retirement of Antony Flynn as head teacher, in February 2018, Oonagh Browne, Depute Head Teacher at nearby Kyle Academy, was appointed head teacher of Queen Margaret Academy.

List of Head Teachers 

 1856–1869 – unknown
 Miss Bridget Bird (1869–1874)
 Miss Annie McLaughlin (1874–1878)
 Miss Johanna Parker (1878–1880)
 Miss Agnes Eugenie Card (1880–1882)
 Miss Margaret Gibson (1883)
 Miss Mary Cairns (1883–1885)
 Miss Annie McDonald (1885–1888)
 Mrs Flora MacDonald (1888–1894)
 Miss Catherine MacDonald (1894)
 Mr James McGrorry (1894–1899)
 Mr Laurence Gemson (1899–1933) – Longest serving headteacher. Founder and director of Ayr United in 1910. Manager of the team, 1915–18.
 Mr Joseph H. Daly (1933–1954) – Died suddenly in office, 1954.
 Mr James McGloin (1954–1976) – Pioneer of schools broadcasting.
 Mr Robert Jardine (1977–1990)
 Mr Daniel Boyle (1990–1996)
 Mr Ian McEwan (1996–2007)
 Mrs Moira Gray (2007–2012)
 Mr Antony Flynn (2012–2018)
 Mrs Oonagh Browne (2018–present)

Rankings

Queen Margaret Academy is currently (as of 2011) in the top 50 (out of an approx total of 376) performing schools in Scotland.

Motto and arms
The school motto is Omne Opus Bonum which is Latin for every good work. The arms were granted to the school in February 1955.

Alumni and former pupils

 Jenny Colgan, author. Her father was also a teacher of Technical and Guidance in the school
 Thomas O'Ware, footballer.

References

External links
Queen Margaret Academy Official Website
Queen Margaret Academy - South Ayrshire Council
Queen Margaret Academy's page on Scottish Schools Online

Schools in Ayr
Catholic secondary schools in South Ayrshire
Educational institutions established in 1977
1977 establishments in Scotland